The  is a kei car with retro styling built by the Japanese carmaker Daihatsu from 2004 to 2009. It is a cosmetic variation of the L150 series Move targeted to women in their late twenties and early thirties who frequent cafes, and is related to the L650 series Mira Gino, another kei car with distinctive retro styling which is based on the L250 series Mira.

It was launched on 23 August 2004, followed by the  version on 2 June 2005. On 4 June 2007, the facelifted model was launched.

The car was discontinued in March 2009 and replaced by both the Move Conte and Mira Cocoa.

The name "Latte" means "milk" in Italian and also refers to the latte coffee.

Gallery

References 

Move Latte
Cars introduced in 2004
Kei cars
Hatchbacks
Front-wheel-drive vehicles
All-wheel-drive vehicles
Retro-style automobiles